The Raisina Dialogue is a multilateral conference held annually in New Delhi, India. Since its inception in 2016, the conference has emerged as India's flagship conference on geopolitics and geo-economics. The conference is hosted by the Observer Research Foundation, an independent think tank, in collaboration with the Ministry of External Affairs of India.

The conference is structured as a multi-stakeholder, cross-sectoral discussion, involving a variety of global policymakers including heads of states, cabinet ministers and local government officials. In addition, the Dialogue also welcomes major private sector executives, as well as members of the media and academia. It is designed on the lines of Singapore's Shangri-La Dialogue.

The name "Raisina Dialogue" comes from Raisina Hill, an elevation in New Delhi, seat of the Government of India, as well as the Presidential Palace of India, Rashtrapati Bhavan.

Raisina Dialogue 2016 

The first Raisina Dialogue was held from 1–3 March 2016. Over 100 speakers from over 35 countries attended to speak on the theme, "Asia: Regional and Global Connectivity". The focus of the 2016 conference was on Asia’s physical, economic, human and digital connectivity. Panels and discussions explored opportunities and challenges for the region to manage its common spaces, as well as the global partnerships needed to develop common pathways in this century.

Following the inaugural conference, the news media lauded the event as "packing a global punch in Delhi".

Raisina Dialogue 2017 
In 2017, The Dialogue was held from 17–19 January. Held on a larger scale, the conference welcomed over 120 speakers from 65 countries and upwards of 800 participants. Attendees discussed the theme, "The New Normal: Multilateralism with Multipolarity". 
The Prime Minister of India, Narendra Modi, inaugurated the 2017 edition of the Raisina Dialogue. Other eminent speakers included the former President of Afghanistan, Hamid Karzai; the former Prime Minister of Canada, Stephen Harper; Nepal’s Minister of Foreign Affairs, Prakash Sharan Mahat; U.K.’s Secretary of State for Foreign & Commonwealth Affairs, Boris Johnson; the Diplomatic Adviser to the President of France, Jacques Audibert; Commander of U.S. Naval Forces, Europe and Africa, Admiral Michelle Howard; Commander of U.S. Pacific Command, Admiral Harry Harris, Jr.; and the Indian Chief of the Army Staff, General Bipin Rawat. The conference report can be found online.

Raisina Dialogue 2018 
The third edition of The Raisina Dialogue was held at the Taj Diplomatic Enclave in New Delhi, India from 16–18 January 2018.

The theme for the 2018 Conference is "Managing Disruptive Transitions: Ideas, Institutions and Idioms". This theme is designed to explore the shifting dynamics within the global order; where old relationships need new directions, emerging partnerships face unprecedented constraints and the notions of power and sovereignty are challenged. The Dialogue will foster discussion on the role of institutions, the possibility of collective action and successful responses to these modern developments.

Raisina Dialogue 2018 was attended by following scholars and officials:

Raisina Dialogue 2019 
The fourth edition of The Raisina Dialogue was held at the Taj Diplomatic Enclave in New Delhi, India from 8–10 January 2019.

The theme for the conference was "New Geometrics | Fluid Partnerships | Uncertain Outcomes". The theme represents a logical progression from the previous edition, which focused on Managing Disruptions and Transitions. In her remarks, then External Affairs Minister Smt. Sushma Swaraj writes, "As the world seeks solutions to the constantly changing political, economic, and strategic landscape, “A World Reorder” is indeed an appropriate and timely theme. I hope the discussions will foster frank deliberations on the geopolitical reordering that is underway and point us towards creative and innovative solutions".

This conference was organised in partnership with Ministry of External Affairs.

Raisina Dialogue 2020

The fifth edition of The Raisina Dialogue was held in New Delhi, India from 14–16 January. The theme for the 2020 Conference was "Navigating the Alpha Centurys". Australian Foreign minister Marise Payne gave the keynote address.

Raisina Dialogue 2021 
The sixth edition of The Raisina Dialogue was held in virtual mode from 13 -16 April 2021 due to the covid-19 pandemic. The theme for 2021 was "ViralWorld: Outbreaks, Outliers and Out of Control". Danish prime minister Mette Frederiksen, Rwandan president Paul Kagame were the chief-guests along with prime minister Modi at the inaugural session.

Raisina Dialogue 2022 
The seventh edition of The Raisina Dialogue was held in-person in New Delhi from 25 April to 27 April 2022. The theme for 2022 is "Terra Nova: Impassioned, Impatient, and Imperilled".

European Commission's president Ursula von der Leyen and Prime Minister Modi are the chief guests. Other key speakers include:

Publications 
Each year, The Raisina Dialogue publishes a series of publications in order to ensure a continual dialogue of conference themes and highlights. Among these publications are The Raisina Files, which contain a set of commentaries authored by high-profile speakers and delegates.

Additionally, ORF publishes a Defence Primer and several policy reports to supplement the conversations held at each conference.

See also
Gateway of India Dialogue

References

External links
 Official website

Political congresses
21st-century diplomatic conferences
Diplomatic conferences in India
2016 establishments in India
2016 establishments in Delhi
Ministry of External Affairs (India)
2016 in foreign relations of India
2016 in international relations
2010s conferences
2020s conferences